The California State University Emeritus and Retired Faculty & Staff Association, also known as CSU-ERSFA, is a statewide, nonprofit organization of emeritus and retired faculty and staff members from all 23 campuses of the California State University system.  The primary mission of CSU-ERFSA is the protection of pension and health care benefits for both active and retired California State University faculty and staff members.  CSU-ERFSA represents the interests of its members before the California State Legislature, various state and federal agencies, CalPERS, and the California State University Chancellor's Office.  CSU-ERFSA also provides assistance to members, who may be experiencing difficulties with their individual pension or health care benefits.

History
The association was formed in 1985 as the California State University Emeritus and Retired Faculty Association (CSU-ERFA) in response to threats and attempts to reduce or eliminate CSU retirees rights, privileges and benefits and to support the activities of retired faculty as continuing members of the academic community. In 2018 members of CSU-ERFA voted to amend the organization's constitution to expand membership eligibility to all retirees from the California State University System, and to change the name of the organization to reflect the expanded membership eligibility. Currently, CSU-ERFSA has approximately 2,500 members, 300 of whom live outside California.  In addition to its efforts to protect retiree benefits, the association provides support to emeritus and retired faculty and staff associations at the individual state university campuses.  At present retired faculty associations at 18 of the 23 campuses maintain a formal affiliation with CSU-ERFSA.  However, membership in an affiliate is not a condition for membership in the statewide organization.

In 1989 CSU-ERFSA (then CSU-ERFA) successfully convinced the CSU Board of Trustees to adopt the resolution (RFSR 06-89-03) which established that "the .... emeritus faculty shall be deemed to be continuing members of the academic community" and shall have privileges "on the same basis as they are enjoyed by the general faculty." In conjunction with other California public employee organizations, CSU-ERFSA helped to secure the passage of Proposition 162, The California Pension Protection Act of 1992, that provides protection against the use of pension funds for general budget purposes.

CSU-ERFSA was instrumental in working with the Public Employees Retirement System (CalPERS) to establish the CalPERS Long-Term Care Insurance Program.  Several features of the program including its flexibility, consumer protection standards, and the California Partnership option were influenced by CSU-ERFSA.

CSU-ERFSA successfully supported federal and state legislation that eliminated the source tax for retirees who live in a different state than that which provides their pension income.  Because of these laws, the pension income of CSU retirees who live outside California is subject only to the state income tax of their state of residence.

Activities
The large majority of CSU-ERFSA members receive retirement and health care benefits from the California Public Employees Retirement System (CalPERS).  A small number of older retirees receive their retirement benefits from the California State Teachers Retirement System (CalSTRS). CSU-ERFSA provides assistance to its members who experience problems with their pension and health-care benefits.

CSU-ERFSA makes available retirement planning advice for active California State University faculty members. In addition, CSU-ERFSA operates a grants program that supports the research, scholarly, and creative activities of its members. Funding for this program is provided from the CSU-ERFA Charitable Foundation, which is a separate organization that holds U.S. Internal Revenue System 501(c)3 status.

CSU-ERFSA maintains liaison with the CSU Academic Senate, the California Faculty Association (CFA), the California State Employees Association (CSEA), the California State Coalition of Retired Employees (SCORE), and the Retired Public Employees Association of California (RPEA).

CSU-ERFSA publishes a quarterly newsletter, The Reporter, for its members, which also is available to the public through the CSU-ERFSA website.

See also 
 California State University
 California State Employees Association
 CalPERS

References

External links 
 California State University Emeritus and Retired Faculty Association (official site)
 California State University
 CSU-ERFSA State Council calls for investigation of CalPERS CEO
 INVENTORY OF THE CALIFORNIA STATE UNIVERSITY EMERITUS AND RETIRED FACULTY ASSOCIATION (CSU-ERFA) COLLECTION, 1977-2006

California State University
Retirement in the United States
Non-profit organizations based in California
1985 establishments in California